The United Nations Educational, Scientific and Cultural Organization (UNESCO) designates World Heritage Sites of outstanding universal value to cultural or natural heritage which have been nominated by countries which are signatories to the UNESCO World Heritage Convention, established in 1972. Cultural heritage consists of monuments (such as architectural works, monumental sculptures, or inscriptions), groups of buildings, and sites (including archaeological sites). Natural features (consisting of physical and biological formations), geological and physiographical formations (including habitats of threatened species of animals and plants), and natural sites which are important from the point of view of science, conservation or natural beauty, are defined as natural heritage. Yemen ratified the convention on 7 October 1980. 

, Yemen has five sites on the list. The first site, the Old Walled City of Shibam, was listed in 1982. The most recent site listed was Landmarks of the Ancient Kingdom of Saba in Marib in 2023. The Socotra Archipelago was listed in 2008, and it is the only natural site in Yemen, while the other four are cultural. All four cultural sites are listed as endangered. The Historic Town of Zabid was listed in 2000 because of the deteriorating state of the historic buildings. Shibam and the Old City of Sana'a were listed in 2015 and Marib in 2023 due to the threats posed by the Yemeni Civil War. Yemen has nine sites on its tentative list. The country served as a member of the World Heritage Committee in the years 1985–1991.

World Heritage Sites 
UNESCO lists sites under ten criteria; each entry must meet at least one of the criteria. Criteria i through vi are cultural, and vii through x are natural.

Tentative list 

In addition to sites inscribed on the World Heritage List, member states can maintain a list of tentative sites that they may consider for nomination. Nominations for the World Heritage List are only accepted if the site was previously listed on the tentative list. , Yemen has listed nine properties on its tentative list.

See also

Tourism in Yemen

References

World Heritage Sites in Yemen
Yemen
World Heritage Sites